Ballycastle is a village in County Mayo, Ireland, situated northwest from Ballina, near Mayo's north coast. It lies on the edge of the Mayo Gaeltacht.

Ballycastle is situated on the coast of north County Mayo, with its northern boundary exposed to the Atlantic Ocean. To the west of the town are the Stags of Broadhaven, to the east lies Killala Bay while to the south are the towns of Ballina and Crossmolina.

History

The Céide Fields, approximately 7 km north of Ballycastle, was where the first settlers began to farm the slopes of the Behy/Glenurla hillside, over 5000 years ago.

The parish of Ballycastle is a combination of the two ancient parishes of Kilbride and Doonfeeney. The name Ballycastle was in use as early as 1470 and was referred to as a parish in the Catholic directory of 1836.

Notable people
Notable people from Ballycastle include the Gaelic footballer Tommy Langan who won two All-Ireland Senior Football Championships for Mayo and was named on the Football Team of the Millennium.

Transport
Ballycastle lies at the junction of the R314 and R315 regional roads. Bus Éireann route 445 serves Ballycastle on weekdays to Ballina via Killala.

Events
Ballycastle is host to Healyfest, a music event which takes place in a pub in the village on each August Bank Holiday.

See also
 List of towns and villages in Ireland

References

External links
 Family History in Ballycastle

Towns and villages in County Mayo